The Shire of Glengallan was a local government area south and east of the regional centre of Warwick in the Darling Downs region of Queensland.

History

On 11 November 1879, the Glengallan Division was created as one of 74 divisions within Queensland under the Divisional Boards Act 1879 with a population of 2608.

With the passage of the Local Authorities Act 1902, it became a Shire on 31 March 1903. Its offices were located at Yangan Road, Warwick.

On 19 March 1992, the Electoral and Administrative Review Commission, created two years earlier, produced its report External Boundaries of Local Authorities, and recommended that local government boundaries in the Warwick area be rationalised into 3 new local government areas.  That recommendation was not implemented, but the outcome was that the Shire of Glengallan was merged with the Shires of Allora and Rosenthal and the City of Warwick to form a new Shire of Warwick. The Local Government (Allora, Glengallan, Rosenthal and Warwick) Regulation 1994 was gazetted on 20 May 1994. On 25 June, an election was held for the new council, and on 1 July 1994, the Shire of Glengallan was abolished.

Towns and localities

The Shire of Glengallan included the following settlements:

 Killarney
 Canningvale
 Elbow Valley
 Emu Vale
 Freestone
 Gladfield
 Glengallan
 Junabee
 Maryvale
 Morgan Park
 Mount Colliery

 Mount Sturt
 Mount Tabor
 Sladevale
 Swanfels
 Tannymorel
 The Falls
 Tregony
 Wiyarra
 Womina
 Yangan

Chairmen
 1880: Mr. J.  Affleck 
 1894: Thomas McGahan
 1927: T. J. Howell

Population

References

External links
 
 

Former local government areas of Queensland
1879 establishments in Australia
1994 disestablishments in Australia